Jonathan French (born 25 September 1976) is an English footballer who played in The Football League for Bristol Rovers and Hull City.

Career
Jon French began his football career playing for his hometown club, Bristol Rovers as a forward in 1995. He made seventeen league appearances and scored one goal for his club. French would later leave the club and join Hull City in 1998. French only made fifteen league appearances scoring no goals. It was then at South Wales club Barry Town where he would make a name for himself. During the three years with Barry Town, he appeared in all fifty-two league matches also scoring seventeen goals for the club. He also appeared in Europe competition for Barry including the notorious 3-1 win against F.C. Porto.

French left Barry Town F.C. in 2003 and went to play for Weston-super-Mare and later playing for Mangotsfield United in 2006 and finished his playing career in 2008.

References

External links

English footballers
Bristol Rovers F.C. players
Hull City A.F.C. players
Barry Town United F.C. players
Weston-super-Mare A.F.C. players
Mangotsfield United F.C. players
English Football League players
1976 births
Living people
Blackpool F.C. players
Association football forwards